Ariqah, formerly known as Ahira, is a village in southern Syria with a population of about 3,000. It is located in the heart of the rocky volcanic plateau of Lejah (also called Lajat). Administratively Ariqah is situated in the Mantiqat Shahba (Shahba district) of As Suwayda Governorate.
Ariqah is known for its volcanic cave which is located in a 10 meters deep hollow in the centre of the village. This cave is known as Ariqa Cave which extends from 2 to 3 kilometers in the old lava streams, it is the biggest known cave in southern Syria.

History
Historically ‘Arīqah was considered the centre of the inaccessible Lajat, many houses from the Byzantine epoch were found in the town and they are still inhabited by locals, there is also an old ruined Byzantine monastery in the town known as "Deir Ariqa".

Ottoman era
In 1596 Al-Ariqah appeared in the Ottoman tax registers as 'Ahiri and was part of the nahiya of Bani Abdullah in the Sanjak Hauran. It had an entirely Muslim population consisting of 18 households and 3 bachelors. The villagers paid a fixed tax rate of 25% on wheat, barley, summer crops, goats and/or beehives and a water mill; a total of 6,500  akçe.

In 1838, it  was noted as Ahiry, a Druze and Catholic village,  situated "in the Lejah, south of Dama".

References

Bibliography

External links
   Map of the town, Google Maps
Ezra-map, 20m

Populated places in Shahba District
Towns in Syria
Druze communities in Syria